Box is the second studio album by Australian rock music group, Chocolate Starfish, The album was released in October 1995 and peaked at number 6 on the ARIA Charts. The album spawned four singles.

Track listing

Charts

Release history

References

1995 albums
Chocolate Starfish albums
Virgin Records albums